English actress Lacey Turner has won a total of thirty-one awards for her portrayal of Stacey Slater in the BBC soap opera EastEnders, including four National Television Awards, six British Soap Awards and eight Inside Soap Awards.

All About Soap Bubble Awards

British Soap Awards

Digital Spy Awards

Digital Spy Soap Awards

Digital Spy Reader Awards

Digital Spy 20th Anniversary Reader Awards

Inside Soap Awards

National Television Awards

Television and Radio Industries Club (TRIC) Awards

TV Choice Awards (formerly known as TV Quick and TV Choice Awards between 2005 and 2009)

TV Now Awards

TVTimes Awards

References

Turner, Lacey